Otis Lee Anderson Jr. (November 12, 1998November 29, 2021) was an American football running back in the National Football League (NFL). He played college football at UCF and entered the NFL as an undrafted free agent in 2021. Not signed to a roster spot ahead of the 2021 season, Anderson received national attention after he was shot and killed by his father the same year.

College career
Anderson attended University Christian School in Jacksonville, Florida and the University of Central Florida (UCF), where he played college football for the Knights. Regarded as a utility player, he was utilized as a running back, wide receiver, and return specialist. He’s second all-time at UCF with yards per carry. He ranks ninth of all-time at UCF with 2,182 career rushing yards. His 3,708 all-purpose yards rank eighth all-time at UCF. He also has 27 total touchdowns; he ranks eighth in the record books.

Professional career
After not being selected in the 2021 NFL Draft, Anderson signed with the Los Angeles Rams as an undrafted free agent. The Rams cut him following training camp. He signed to the team's practice squad on September 1, 2021, and was released on September 20.

Death
Anderson was shot and killed by his father, Otis Lee Anderson Sr., in a domestic disturbance on November 29, 2021.

References

External links
 Los Angeles Rams bio
 UCF Knights football bio

1998 births
2021 deaths
Players of American football from Jacksonville, Florida
American football running backs
UCF Knights football players
Los Angeles Rams players
Deaths by firearm in Florida